George Clamback (1901-1978) was an Australian rugby league footballer who played in the 1920s, was a referee in the 1930s and was later a club administrator.

Frederick Charles Clamback, known as 'George' Clamback was a Newtown junior who was graded in 1917 and debut in 1918. He went on to play 6 years at Newtown and also played two seasons with the Eastern Suburbs club.

He later became a first grade referee in the NSWRFL in the late 1920s-1930s  before taking on the job of Secretary of the Newtown. He was President of the Newtown in 1939, and the club delegate to the NSWRFL for many years. 

Clamback died in Toukley, New South Wales on 23 September 1978 aged 77.

References

1901 births
1978 deaths
Australian rugby league referees
Australian rugby league administrators
Australian rugby league players
Newtown Jets players
Rugby league players from Sydney
Rugby league props
Sydney Roosters players